Joshua Bernard Pereira (born 10 October 1997) is a Singaporean professional footballer who captains and plays as a full-back or midfielder for Singapore Premier League club Geylang International and the Singapore national team.

Education 
Pereira studied hospitality and tourism management at Temasek Polytechnic.

Career 

Pereira started his career with the NFA and caught the eye while representing the national under-18 team during their qualification tournament for the 2016 AFC Under-19 Championship.

In December 2015, he won the New Paper Dollah Kassim Award and trained with Ligue 1 side AS Saint-Étienne for a week.

He signed for Young Lions FC for the 2016 S.League season and impressed the pundits although the team failed to perform as expected.

In 2020, he signed for Geylang International.

International career 
Pereira was part of the U21 team which played China U21 team in 2016. He captained the U22 in the 2020 AFC U-23 Championship qualification in 2019.

In September 2022, Pereira received his first call up to the senior Singapore squad for the 2022 VFF Tri-Nations Series held in Vietnam. He made his international debut in a 4-0 friendly loss to Vietnam before collecting his second cap in the same friendly tournament in a 1-1 draw against India.

Later in December, Pereira was part of the national team for the 2022 AFF Championship.

Career statistics 
. Caps and goals may not be correct

 Young Lions are ineligible for qualification to AFC competitions in their respective leagues.

International statistics

International caps

U22 International caps

U19 International caps

U19 International goals
Scores and results list Singapore's goal tally first.

Honours

International
Singapore U22
 Merlion Cup: 2019

Individual 

 The New Paper Dollah Kassim Award : 2015

References

External links 

1997 births
Living people
Singaporean footballers
Association football midfielders
Singapore Premier League players
Young Lions FC players
Competitors at the 2017 Southeast Asian Games
Competitors at the 2019 Southeast Asian Games
Southeast Asian Games competitors for Singapore